Exodus is a 2005 greatest hits album by rapper Ja Rule. He had released an album every year since 1999, but in 2005, with no new album planned The Inc. released this greatest hits album featuring songs such as "Mesmerize" and "Wonderful".

Irv Gotti was forced to release one more album from Ja and Ashanti to honor his contract with Def Jam. Universal did not want to support a full LP by either artist so 2 greatest hits sets were released. The version of It's Murda on this album is shortened and not the original.

The album was also made in an edited version, which has some lacks of censorship in songs due to different times the songs were edited at.

The album debuted on the Billboard 200 at number 107 and peaked at number 50 on the UK albums chart.

Track listing
Credits adapted from the album's liner notes.

Notes
 signifies a co-producer.

Sample credits
 "Exodus (Intro)" contains samples from "Lyin'", written by Anthony Hawkins, Charles Hawkins, and Veesee Veasey, performed by Black Merda.
 "I Cry" contains a sample from "Cry Together", written by Kenny Gamble and Leon Huff, performed by The O'Jays.
 "Livin' It Up" contains excerpts from "Do I Do", written by Stevie Wonder.
 "Ain't It Funny (Murder Remix)" contains a portion of "Flava in Ya Ear", written by Craig Mack and Osten Harvey, Jr., performed by Craig Mack.
 "Thug Lovin'" contains interpolations from "Knocks Me Off My Feet", written by Stevie Wonder.
 "Mesmerize" contains interpolations from "Stop, Look, Listen", written by Thom Bell and Linda Creed.
 "New York" contains interpolations from "100 Guns", written by Lawrence Parker.
 "Daddy's Little Baby" contains an interpolation of "Voyage To Atlantis", written by Ronald Isley, O'Kelly Isley Jr., Rudolph Isley, Ernie Isley, Marvin Isley, and Chris Jasper.

Charts

Weekly charts

Certifications

References

2005 greatest hits albums
Ja Rule albums
Albums produced by Irv Gotti
Albums produced by Chink Santana